Isaija the Monk ( or in English: Inok Isaija; ca. 1300–after 1375), also known as Elder Isaija (Elder Isaiah) and Isaija of Serres (Elder Isaiah of Serres) , was a 14th-century Serbian monk, one of many Serbian monk-scribes in the Middle Ages who translated ancient Greek manuscripts into the Serbian recension of Old Church Slavonic. His major work is the translation of the works of Pseudo-Dionysius the Areopagite from Byzantine Greek. Isaija's commentaries on political events occur in the context of the fall of the Serbian principality of Serres in 1371, which led the descendants of these local governors to accept Ottoman suzerainty.

As a young boy, Isaija joined the monastic life of the Serbian Orthodox Church affiliated to St. Joachim of Osogovo Monastery on Osogovo Mountain in northern Macedonia, and then to Hilandar Monastery on Mount Athos in Greece, where he spent the rest of his life. In Hilandar, he worked as a translator and became very respected by Serbian rulers as attested to by the anonymous author of The Life of the Monk Isaija, probably written in the late 14th century.

Isaija was a very prominent individual during the reign of Stephen Dushan and Lazar of Serbia. He was a monk with an excellent reputation and he also excelled as a writer, translator, and diplomat. Between 1353 and 1363 he travelled throughout Serbia; he later served as a Serbian diplomat, and he proved to be very skilled during the negotiations initiated by Prince Lazar in order to reconcile the Serbian and the Greek Church, which was achieved in 1375 after resolving difficult diplomatic and ecclesiastical issues with Patriarch Philotheus I of Constantinople. Isaija's dragoman on the mission to Constantinople was Nicodemus of Tismana, Prince Lazar's relative.

At the end of his Pseudo-Dionysius the Areopagite translation, Isaija added an inscription and used a cryptogram to write his name.

Isaija had an anonymous disciple, known only as Isaija's Disciple, who wrote the biography of "Isaija the Monk". No biographical data of this author is extant. He is known in Serbian literature only as Nepoznati Svetogorac, the Anonymous Athonite.

Work
The climate of despair which set in after the Battle of Maritsa in 1371 is expressed in a long personal comment, written by Isaija the Monk. This literary comment is appended to Isaija's translation of the works of Pseudo-Dionysius the Areopagite into Old Serbian which, he says, he had started " in happy times," but had finished it after the battle, "when Ishmelites spread over the entire land as birds in the air, slaying some of the Christians, sending others into slavery... And the land became deprived of all that is good, people, beast, the fruit of all kind. There was no prince, nor leader or teacher among people, nobody to save them... And truly was the living envying the dead."

See also
Saint Sava (1174-1236), the most important Serbian writer of his time
Teodosije the Hilandarian (1246-1328), one of the most important Serbian writers in the Middle Ages
Elder Grigorije (fl. 1310-1355), builder of Saint Archangels Monastery
Antonije Bagaš (fl. 1356-1366), bought and restored the Agiou Pavlou monastery
Lazar the Hilandarian (fl. 1404), the first known Serbian and Russian watchmaker
Pachomius the Serb (fl. 1440s-1484), hagiographer of the Russian Church
 Miroslav Gospel
 Gabriel the Hilandarian
 Constantine of Kostenets
 Cyprian, Metropolitan of Kiev and All Rus'
 Gregory Tsamblak
 Elder Siluan
 Grigorije of Gornjak
 Atanasije (scribe)
 Rajčin Sudić
 Jakov of Serres
 Romylos of Vidin
 Nicodemus of Tismana
 Dimitar of Kratovo
 Marko Pećki
 Đurađ Crnojević
 Spiridon (patriarch)
 Kalist Rasoder

References

 Mateja Matejić and Dragan Milivojević, "Anthology of Medieval Serbian Literature in English" (1978, Slavica Publishers, Inc., Columbus, Ohio) pages 159-163.

14th-century Serbian writers
Medieval Serbian Orthodox clergy
14th-century births
14th-century deaths
Year of birth unknown
Year of death unknown
Translators from Greek
Medieval European scribes
Serbian monks
14th-century Christian monks
People associated with Hilandar Monastery